Pingla is a village in the Pingla CD block in the Kharagpur subdivision of the Paschim Medinipur district  in the state of West Bengal, India.

Geography

Location

Area overview
Kharagpur subdivision, shown partly in the map alongside, mostly has alluvial soils, except in two CD blocks in the west – Kharagpur I and Keshiary, which mostly have lateritic soils. Around 74% of the total cultivated area is cropped more than once. With a density of population of 787 per km2nearly half of the district’s population resides in this subdivision. 14.33% of the population lives in urban areas and 86.67% lives in the rural areas.

Note: The map alongside presents some of the notable locations in the subdivision. All places marked in the map are linked in the larger full screen map.

Demographics
As per 2011 Census of India Pingla had a total population of 5,253 of which 2,639 (50%) were males and 2,614 (50%) were females. Population below 6 years was 665. The total number of literates in Pingla was 3,538 (67.35% of the population over 6 years).

Civic administration

CD block HQ
The headquarters of Pingla CD block are located at Pingla.

Police station
Pingla police station has jurisdiction over Pingla  CD Block.

Education
Pingla Thana Mahavidyalaya, located at Maligram, was set up in 1965. It is affiliated to Vidyasagar University and as of 2016 offers undergraduate courses in Humanities, Commerce and Science. Post-graduate programme in Bengali was added in 2014-15 and efforts are on to add PG programme in commerce.

Healthcare
Pingla Rural Hospital, with 30 beds at Pingla, is the major Government medical facility in the Pingla CD block.

References

Villages in Paschim Medinipur district